Anthology is a collection of previously unreleased Rough Cutt material.

The Fiddler's Studio Sessions were recorded before the band's first album was recorded.

An earlier version of "Try a Little Harder", with Craig Goldy on guitar, was released on the KLOS 95 1/2: Rock to Riches compilation in 1983.  The song "Prowler" was re-recorded for inclusion on Rough Cutt Live as one of 3 studio bonus tracks.

"Dreamin' Again", "Try a Little Harder", "Crank It Up" and "Street Gang Livin'" were all performed live on the 'Rock Palace' TV show, taped on January 1, 1984, at the Hollywood Palace, now the Avalon Hollywood.

Track list

Disc 1

Fiddler's Studio Sessions 1984
 Take Her
 Stranger/Dressed to Kill
 Dreamin' Again
 Cutt Your Heart Out
 You Keep Breaking My Heart
 Take It or Leave It
 Queen of Seduction
 Try a Little Harder
 Crank It Up
 Prowler
 Street Gang Livin'
 Motive for Love

1987 Sessions
 Bad Boys
 Hold On
 You Want It You Got It

Disc 2: Live Syracuse September 17, 1985
 Cutt Your Heart Out
 Kids Will Rock
 Never Gonna Die
 Dressed to Kill
 She's Too Hot
 Black Widow
 Take Her
 Drum Solo
 Don't Settle for Less
 Try a Little Harder
 Piece of My Heart

Credits
Paul Shortino: Lead Vocals
Amir Derakh: Guitar
Chris Hager: Guitar
Matt Thorr: Bass
Dave Alford: Drums

References

External links
 Paul Shortino official website

Rough Cutt albums
2008 compilation albums
2008 live albums